This page provides supplementary chemical data on Terephthalic acid,  the organic compound and one of three isomeric phthalic acids, all with formula C6H4(CO2H)2.

Material Safety Data Sheet  

The handling of this chemical may require notable safety precautions, which are set forth on the Material Safety Datasheet (MSDS) for it.SIRI

Structure and properties

Thermodynamic properties

Spectral data

References 

Chemical data pages
Chemical data pages cleanup